Sokolska planina (Serbian Cyrillic: Соколска планина) is a mountain in western Serbia, near the town of Krupanj. Its highest peak Rožanj has an elevation of 973 meters above sea level.

References

Mountains of Serbia